Donald Campbell MacNeil (January 4, 1924 – October 24, 1978) was a Canadian politician. He represented the electoral district of Cape Breton South in the Nova Scotia House of Assembly from 1956 to 1970. He is a member of the Nova Scotia Progressive Conservative Party.

MacNeil was born in Sydney, Nova Scotia. He attended Acadia University, St. Francis Xavier University, and Dalhousie University. He earned a Bachelor of Laws from Dalhousie in 1948 and went into law practice. In 1948, he married Marguerite Shirley Cameron. He served in the Executive Council of Nova Scotia as Minister of Municipal Affairs.

References

1924 births
1978 deaths
Progressive Conservative Association of Nova Scotia MLAs
Members of the Executive Council of Nova Scotia
People from Sydney, Nova Scotia
Acadia University alumni
Dalhousie University alumni
St. Francis Xavier University alumni